Susan Merdinger (born October 29, 1962) is an American classical pianist, music director, and educator.  Merdinger won a gold medal at the Global Music Awards in 2014.

Education 
Merdinger graduated from Yale University, the Yale School of Music, the Manhattan School of Music, the Westchester Conservatory of Music, and the École Normale de Musique in Fontainebleau, France.

Career 
Merdinger  won a gold medal in the 2014 Global Music Awards, First Prize in the 2017 and 2012 Bradshaw and Buono International Piano Competition (in the Solo and Duo Piano divisions), the Dewar's Young Artist Award in Music (1990), as well as Artists International Young Musicians Competition (1986) and Artists International Distinguished Alumni Award (1990).

References

External links
 Susan Merdinger's website

American classical pianists
American women classical pianists
Jewish classical pianists
Living people
1962 births
Yale University alumni
20th-century American pianists
20th-century American women pianists
21st-century classical pianists
21st-century American women pianists
21st-century American pianists